The International Civil Aviation Organization (ICAO) is a specialized agency of the United Nations that coordinates the principles and techniques of international air navigation, and fosters the planning and development of international air transport to ensure safe and orderly growth. ICAO headquarters are located in the Quartier International of Montreal, Quebec, Canada.

The ICAO Council adopts standards and recommended practices concerning air navigation, its infrastructure, flight inspection, prevention of unlawful interference, and facilitation of border-crossing procedures for international civil aviation. ICAO defines the protocols for air accident investigation that are followed by transport safety authorities in countries signatory to the Chicago Convention on International Civil Aviation.

The Air Navigation Commission (ANC) is the technical body within ICAO. The commission is composed of 19 commissioners, nominated by the ICAO's contracting states and appointed by the ICAO Council. Commissioners serve as independent experts, who although nominated by their states, do not serve as state or political representatives. International Standards and Recommended Practices are developed under the direction of the ANC through the formal process of ICAO Panels. Once approved by the commission, standards are sent to the council, the political body of ICAO, for consultation and coordination with the member states before final adoption.

ICAO is distinct from other international air transport organizations, particularly because it alone is vested with international authority (among signatory states): other organizations include the International Air Transport Association (IATA), a trade association representing airlines; the Civil Air Navigation Services Organization (CANSO), an organization for Air navigation service providers (ANSPs); and the Airports Council International, a trade association of airport authorities.

History 
The forerunner to ICAO was the International Commission for Air Navigation (ICAN). It held its first convention in 1903 in Berlin, Germany, but no agreements were reached among the eight countries that attended. At the second convention in 1906, also held in Berlin, twenty-seven countries attended. The third convention, held in London in 1912, allocated the first radio callsigns for use by aircraft. ICAN continued to operate until 1945.

Fifty-two countries signed the Chicago Convention on International Civil Aviation, also known as the Chicago Convention, in Chicago, Illinois, on 7 December 1944. Under its terms, a Provisional International Civil Aviation Organization was to be established, to be replaced in turn by a permanent organization when twenty-six countries ratified the convention. Accordingly, PICAO began operating on 6 June 1945, replacing ICAN. The twenty-sixth country ratified the convention on 5 March 1947 and, consequently, PICAO was disestablished on 4 April 1947 and replaced by ICAO, which began operations the same day. In October 1947, ICAO became an agency of the United Nations under its Economic and Social Council (ECOSOC).

In April 2013, Qatar offered to serve as the new permanent seat of the Organization. Qatar promised to construct a massive new headquarters for ICAO and to cover all moving expenses, stating that Montreal "was too far from Europe and Asia", "had cold winters", was hard to attend due to the Canadian government's slow issuance of visas, and that the taxes imposed on ICAO by Canada were too high. According to The Globe and Mail, Qatar's invitation was at least partly motivated by the pro-Israel foreign policy of Canadian Prime Minister Stephen Harper. Approximately one month later, Qatar withdrew its bid after a separate proposal to the ICAO's governing council to move the ICAO triennial conference to Doha was defeated by a vote of 22–14.

Taiwan controversy 
In January 2020, ICAO blocked a number of Twitter users—among them think-tank analysts, employees of the United States Congress, and journalists—who mentioned Taiwan in tweets related to ICAO. Many of the tweets concerned the COVID-19 pandemic and Taiwan's exclusion from ICAO safety and health bulletins due to Chinese pressure.

In response to questions from reporters, ICAO issued a tweet stating that publishers of "irrelevant, compromising and offensive material" would be "precluded". Since that action, the organization has followed a policy of blocking anyone asking about it. The United States House Committee on Foreign Affairs harshly criticized ICAO's perceived failure to uphold principles of fairness, inclusion, and transparency by silencing non-disruptive opposing voices. Senator Marco Rubio also criticized the move. The Ministry of Foreign Affairs (Taiwan) (MOFA) and Taiwanese legislators criticized the move with MOFA head Jaushieh Joseph Wu tweeting in support of those blocked.

Anthony Philbin, chief of communications of the ICAO Secretary General, rejected criticism of ICAO's handling of the situation: "We felt we were completely warranted in taking the steps we did to defend the integrity of the information and discussions our followers should reasonably expect from our feeds." In exchanges with International Flight Network, Philbin refused to acknowledge the existence of Taiwan.

On 1 February 2020, the US State Department issued a press release which heavily criticized ICAO's actions, characterizing them as "outrageous, unacceptable, and not befitting of a UN organization."

Statute 
The 9th edition of the Convention on International Civil Aviation includes modifications from years 1948 up to 2006. ICAO refers to its current edition of the convention as the Statute and designates it as ICAO Document 7300/9. The convention has 19 Annexes that are listed by title in the article Convention on International Civil Aviation.

Membership 

, there are 193 ICAO members, consisting of 192 of the 193 UN members (all but Liechtenstein, which lacks an international airport), plus the Cook Islands.

Despite Liechtenstein not being a direct party to ICAO, its government has delegated Switzerland to enter into the treaty on its behalf, and the treaty applies in the territory of Liechtenstein.

The Republic of China (Taiwan) was a founding member of ICAO but was replaced by the People's Republic of China as the legal representative of China in 1971 and as such, did not take part in the organization. In 2013, Taiwan was for the first time invited to attend the ICAO Assembly, at its 38th session, as a guest under the name of Chinese Taipei. , it has not been invited to participate again, due to renewed PRC pressure. The host government, Canada, supports Taiwan's inclusion in ICAO. Support also comes from Canada's commercial sector with the president of the Air Transport Association of Canada saying in 2019 that "It's about safety in aviation so from a strictly operational and non-political point of view, I believe Taiwan should be there."

Council 

The Council of ICAO is elected by the Assembly every 3 years and consists of 36 members elected in 3 groups. The present Council was elected in October 2022.
The structure of the present Council is as follows:

Air Navigation Commission 

The Air Navigation Commission (ANC) is the ICAO Council technical executive body in charge of 17 of the 19 Annexes to the Chicago Convention. ANC develops and recommend ICAO minimal standards that are related to these Annexes. To review and/or finalize the ongoing developments the commission meets for three sessions per year. Each session normally considers a number of documents being developments of ANC expert Panels. The ANC is composed of nineteen commissioners nominated by ICAO States in various aviation domains. However, legally these commissioners do not represent the interest of their State or any particular State or region. They have to conduct independently in the interest of the entire international civil aviation community. Additionally, several other representatives from ICAO States and up to eight members from the civil aviation industry may be invited to take part in ANC meetings as observers.

Standards 

ICAO also standardizes certain functions for use in the airline industry, such as the Aeronautical Message Handling System (AMHS). This makes it a standards organization.

Each country should have an accessible Aeronautical Information Publication (AIP), based on standards defined by ICAO, containing information essential to air navigation. Countries are required to update their AIP manuals every 28 days and so provide definitive regulations, procedures and information for each country about airspace and airports. ICAO's standards also dictate that temporary hazards to aircraft must be regularly published using NOTAMs.

ICAO defines an International Standard Atmosphere (also known as ICAO Standard Atmosphere), a model of the standard variation of pressure, temperature, density, and viscosity with altitude in the Earth's atmosphere. This is useful in calibrating instruments and designing aircraft. The standardized pressure is also used in calibrating instruments in-flight, particularly above the transition altitude.

ICAO is active in infrastructure management, including communication, navigation and surveillance / air traffic management (CNS/ATM) systems, which employ digital technologies (like satellite systems with various levels of automation) in order to maintain a seamless global air traffic management system.

Passport standards 
ICAO has published standards for machine-readable passports. Machine-readable passports have an area where some of the information otherwise written in textual form is also written as strings of alphanumeric characters, printed in a manner suitable for optical character recognition. This enables border controllers and other law enforcement agents to process such passports more quickly, without having to enter the information manually into a computer. ICAO's technical standard for machine-readable passports is contained in Document 9303 Machine Readable Travel Documents.

A more recent standard covers biometric passports. These contain biometrics to authenticate the identity of travellers. The passport's critical information is stored on a tiny RFID computer chip, much like information stored on smart cards. Like some smart cards, the passport book design calls for an embedded contactless chip that is able to hold digital signature data to ensure the integrity of the passport and the biometric data.

Aerodrome reference code

Registered codes 
Both ICAO and IATA have their own airport and airline code systems.

Airport codes

ICAO uses 4-letter airport codes (vs. IATA's 3-letter codes). The ICAO code is based on the region and country of the airport—for example, Charles de Gaulle Airport has an ICAO code of LFPG, where L indicates Southern Europe, F, France, PG, Paris de Gaulle, while Orly Airport has the code LFPO (the 3rd letter sometimes refers to the particular flight information region (FIR) or the last two may be arbitrary). In most parts of the world, ICAO and IATA codes are unrelated; for example, Charles de Gaulle Airport has an IATA code of CDG. However, the location prefix for continental United States is K, and ICAO codes are usually the IATA code with this prefix. For example, the ICAO code for Los Angeles International Airport is KLAX. Canada follows a similar pattern, where a prefix of C is usually added to an IATA code to create the ICAO code. For example, Calgary International Airport is YYC or CYYC. (In contrast, airports in Hawaii are in the Pacific region and so have ICAO codes that start with PH; Kona International Airport's code is PHKO. Similarly, airports in Alaska have ICAO codes that start with PA. Merrill Field, for instance is PAMR.) Not all airports are assigned codes in both systems; for example, airports that do not have airline service do not need an IATA code.

Airline codes 
ICAO also assigns 3-letter airline codes (versus the more-familiar 2-letter IATA codes—for example, UAL vs. UA for United Airlines). ICAO also provides telephony designators to aircraft operators worldwide, a one- or two-word designator used on the radio, usually, but not always, similar to the aircraft operator name. For example, the identifier for Japan Airlines International is JAL and the designator is Japan Air, but Aer Lingus is EIN and Shamrock. Thus, a Japan Airlines flight numbered 111 would be written as "JAL111" and pronounced "Japan Air One One One" on the radio, while a similarly numbered Aer Lingus would be written as "EIN111" and pronounced "Shamrock One One One". In the US, FAA practices require the digits of the flight number to be spoken in group format ("Japan Air One Eleven" in the above example) while individual digits are used for the aircraft tail number used for unscheduled civil flights.

Aircraft registrations 
ICAO maintains the standards for aircraft registration ("tail numbers"), including the alphanumeric codes that identify the country of registration. For example, airplanes registered in the United States have tail numbers starting with N, and airplanes registered in Bahrain have tail numbers starting with A9C.

Aircraft type designators 

ICAO is also responsible for issuing 2-4 character alphanumeric aircraft type designators for those aircraft types which are most commonly provided with air traffic service. These codes provide an abbreviated aircraft type identification, typically used in flight plans. For example, the Boeing 747-100, -200 and -300 are given the type designators B741, B742 and B743 respectively.

Use of the International System of Units 
Since 2010, ICAO recommends a unification of units of measurement within aviation based on the International System of Units (SI), using:
 Kilometres per hour (km/h) for speed during travel.
 Metres per second (m/s) for wind speed during landing.
 Kilometres (km) for distance.
 Metres (m) for elevation.

Non-SI units have been permitted for temporary use since 1979, but a termination date has not yet been established, which would complete metrication of worldwide aviation, and the following units are still in widespread use within commercial aviation:
 Knots (kn) for speed.
 Nautical mile (NM) for distance.
 Foot (ft) for elevation.
Inches of mercury are used in Japan and North America to measure pressure.

Notably, aviation in Russia and China currently use km/h for reporting airspeed, and many present-day European glider planes also indicate airspeed in kilometres per hour. China and North Korea use metres for reporting altitude when communicating with pilots. Russia also formerly used metres exclusively for reporting altitude, but in 2011 changed to feet for high altitude flight. From February 2017, Russian airspace started transitioning to reporting altitude in feet only. Runway lengths are now commonly given in metres worldwide, except in North America where feet are commonly used.

The table below summarizes some of the units commonly used in flight and ground operations, as well as their recommended replacement. A full list of recommended units can be found in annex 5 to the Convention on International Civil Aviation.

 Altitude, elevation, height.

Regions and regional offices 
ICAO has a headquarters, seven regional offices, and one regional sub-office:
 Headquarters – Montreal, Quebec, Canada
 Asia and Pacific (APAC) – Bangkok, Thailand; Sub-office – Beijing, China
 Eastern and Southern African (ESAF) – Nairobi, Kenya
 Europe and North Atlantic (EUR/NAT) – Paris, France
 Middle East (MID) – Cairo, Egypt
 North American, Central American and Caribbean (NACC) – Mexico City, Mexico
 South American (SAM) – Lima, Peru
 Western and Central African (WACAF) – Dakar, Senegal

Leadership

List of Secretaries General

List of Council Presidents

Environment 

Emissions from international aviation are specifically excluded from the targets agreed under the Kyoto Protocol. Instead, the Protocol invites developed countries to pursue the limitation or reduction of emissions through the International Civil Aviation Organization. ICAO's environmental committee continues to consider the potential for using market-based measures such as trading and charging, but this work is unlikely to lead to global action. It is currently developing guidance for states who wish to include aviation in an emissions trading scheme (ETS) to meet their Kyoto commitments, and for airlines who wish to participate voluntarily in a trading scheme.

Emissions from domestic aviation are included within the Kyoto targets agreed by countries. This has led to some national policies such as fuel and emission taxes for domestic air travel in the Netherlands and Norway, respectively. Although some countries tax the fuel used by domestic aviation, there is no duty on kerosene used on international flights.

ICAO is currently opposed to the inclusion of aviation in the European Union Emission Trading Scheme (EU ETS). The EU, however, is pressing ahead with its plans to include aviation.

ICAO has been called "flawed and biased in favour of the industry" by Jo Dardenne, the manager for aviation at Transport & Environment.

Carbon Offsetting and Reduction Scheme for International Aviation

The agreement will use an offsetting scheme called CORSIA (the Carbon Offsetting and Reduction Scheme for International Aviation) under which forestry and other carbon-reducing activities are directly funded, amounting to about 2% of annual revenues for the sector. Rules against 'double counting' should ensure that existing forest protection efforts are not recycled. The scheme does not take effect until 2021 and will be voluntary until 2027, but many countries, including the US and China, have promised to begin at its 2020 inception date. Under the agreement, the global aviation emissions target is a 50% reduction by 2050 relative to 2005. NGO reaction to the deal was mixed.

The agreement has critics. It is not aligned with the 2015 Paris climate agreement, which set the objective of restricting global warming to 1.5 to 2 °C. A late draft of the agreement would have required the air transport industry to assess its share of global carbon budgeting to meet that objective, but the text was removed in the agreed version. CORSIA will regulate only about 25 percent of aviation's international emissions, since it grandfathers all emissions below the 2020 level, allowing unregulated growth until then. Only 65 nations will participate in the initial voluntary period, not including significant emitters Russia, India and perhaps Brazil. The agreement does not cover domestic emissions, which are 40% of the global industry's overall emissions. One observer of the ICAO convention made this summary:  although another critic called it "a timid step in the right direction."

Air quality
Emissions limits for aircraft engines are defined by the Annex 16, Volume 2 of the ICAO Technology Standards, they include standards for Hydrocarbons, Carbon monoxide, NOx, Smoke and Particulate Matter for Local Air Quality near airports, below .
The first ICAO emissions regulation was adopted in 1981, and more stringent NOx standards were subsequently adopted: CAEP/2 in 1993, CAEP/4 in 1999, CAEP/6 in 2005 and CAEP/8 in 2011.
Higher bypass ratios, lean burn and Rich Quick Quench Lean combustor design can reduce NOx emissions.

Investigations of air disasters 
Most air accident investigations are carried out by an agency of a country that is associated in some way with the accident. For example, the Air Accidents Investigation Branch conducts accident investigations on behalf of the British Government. ICAO has conducted four investigations involving air disasters, of which two were passenger airliners shot down while in international flight over hostile territory.
 Libyan Arab Airlines Flight 114 which was shot down on 21 February 1973 by Israeli F-4 jets over the Sinai Peninsula during a period of tension that led to the Arab-Israeli Yom Kippur War killing 108 people.
 Korean Air Lines Flight 007, which was shot down on 1 September 1983 by a Soviet Su-15 interceptor near Moneron Island just west of Sakhalin Island during a period of heightened Cold War tension killing all 269 people on board including U.S. Representative Larry McDonald.
 UTA Flight 772, which was destroyed by a bomb on 19 September 1989 above the Sahara Desert in Niger, en route from N'Djamena, Chad, to Paris, France. The explosion caused the aircraft to break up, killing all 156 passengers and 15 crew members, including the wife of U.S. Ambassador Robert L. Pugh. Investigators determined that a bomb placed in the cargo hold by Chadian rebels backed by Libya was responsible for the explosion. A French court convicted in absentia six Libyans of planning and implementing the attack.
The 1996 shootdown of Brothers to the Rescue aircraft on 24 February 1996, when two civilian aircraft operating north of Cuba were shot down by two jets of the Cuban Air Force. The Cuban military alleged that aircraft operated by the group Brothers to the Rescue had scattered propaganda leaflets onto Cuba prior to the incident, and issued orders that such aircraft be shot down. All four crew members aboard the two aircraft were killed, whilst a third aircraft managed to escape and return to the American mainland.

Drone regulations and registration 
ICAO is looking at having a singular ledger for drone registration to help law enforcement globally. Currently, ICAO is responsible for creating drone regulations across the globe, and it is expected that it will only maintain the registry. This activity is seen as a forerunner to global regulations on flying drones under the auspices of the ICAO.

ICAO currently maintains the 'UAS Regulation Portal' for various countries to list their country's UAS regulations and also review the best practices from across the globe.

See also 
 Airline codes (includes ICAO codes)
 Fédération Aéronautique Internationale (FAI)
 Freedoms of the air
 International Civil Aviation Organization airport code
 International Maritime Organization
 Kenneth Macdonald Beaumont
 List of aircraft manufacturers by ICAO name

References

External links 

 Official website of the International Civil Aviation Organization
 Convention on International Civil Aviation – Document 7300
 ECCAIRS 4.2.8 Data Definition Standard – Location Indicators by State, 17 Sep 2010 
 ICAO Aircraft and Manufacturer Codes – Document 8643
 The Postal History of the International Civil Aviation Organization (ICAO)
 ICAO Will Mute Mics At Mention of Taiwan: Paraguay Official

 
Civil aviation authorities
Organizations based in Montreal
International organizations based in Canada
Organizations established in 1947
United Nations specialized agencies
Canada and the United Nations